"Runnin" (commonly referred to as "Runnin' from tha Police") is a 1995 song by rappers 2Pac and The Notorious B.I.G. featuring  Stretch, Dramacydal (later known as Outlawz) and Buju Banton. The song is significant, being one of very few compositions 2Pac and The Notorious B.I.G. created together, as later hostility arose between the two rappers, ending all possible collaborations and inciting the East-West Coast Rivalry. The song, originally slated to appear on Thug Life's 1994 debut album, Thug Life, Volume I, and 2Pac's 1995 album, Me Against The World, was scrapped both times due to varying controversies. It was later featured on the 1995 One Million Strong compilation album. The song was released by Black Jam as an unofficial single in 1997 after the death of the two rappers. It charted at #81, #57 and #13 on the Billboard Hot 100, Hot R&B/Hip-Hop Singles & Tracks & Hot Rap Singles charts, respectively.

The first verse is performed by three of the four members of the rap group Dramacydal (referred to in the song as the Thoro Headz) who would go on to join 2Pac's Outlawz group (Young Hollywood, K-Dog, and Big Malcolm, in that order), the second by Stretch and the Notorious B.I.G., and the third and last by 2Pac.

Song meaning
Runnin' From tha Police deals with the authors' troubles with the police. The lyrics contain verbal abuse toward police officers, and even allusion the possibility of killing them (two cops is on the milk box, missing, or let's serve these motherfuckers slugs [bullets] as a fuckin' meal), albeit in possible self-defense.

Releases
"Runnin' from the Police" was originally intended to feature on Thug Life's debut album Thug Life, Volume I, but was cut due to heavy criticism of gangsta rap at the time. It was subsequently scheduled to appear on Shakur's next album Me Against The World, with a different 2Pac verse, but was cut due to the shooting in 1994 that would lead to his bitter rivalry with the Notorious B.I.G.

Three versions of the song were recorded, all produced by Easy Mo Bee. The first version, often called the "Thug Life" version, features the same lyrics as the latest version by Mo Bee but the chorus is sung by Buju Banton and the beat is slightly altered.

A second version, often called the "Me Against the World" version due to initially being slated to appear on that album, featured the same beat as the Thug Life version but had a different 2Pac verse and the chorus was sung by a child rapper named Lil' Vicious. It never released due to the controversy surrounding children performing in adult-themed media. In this case, "Runnin talked about drugs and shooting at cops, themes considered inappropriate for children. 2Pac's fallout with The Notorious B.I.G. also contributed to the decision not to feature the song on the album.

The third version recorded was released a year later in 1995 as part of a compilation album of original hip hop music entitled One Million Strong, a release by SOLAR Records to commemorate the 1995 Million Man March in Washington, D.C., which also featured songs by Mobb Deep, Dr. Dre, Snoop Doggy Dogg, Bone Thugs-N-Harmony, Sunz of Man, among others. This version is perhaps the most famous of the three as it was the only one to be officially released, and featured a more altered sample, a different chorus by Red Fox, and the same lyrics as the Thug Life version.

Sample, remixes, and legacy
The song contains a sample of the song "Munchies for Your Love" by Bootsy Collins from his 1977 album Ahh... The Name Is Bootsy, Baby!. The two earlier, unreleased versions of the song contain a much less edited sample.

In 2Pac's song "Dear Mama", a single from the album from which "Runnin was cut, he alludes to his vocals leading up to his verse in "Runnin ("runnin' from the police, that's right"). The verse in "Dear Mama" reads, "And runnin' from the police, that's right / Mama catch me, put a whoopin' to my backside".

In 1998, a remix was released in Europe by Swedish DJ StoneBridge called Runnin' (Stone's Remix). It sampled Kool & the Gang's 1975 song Summer Madness in addition to "Munchies for Your Love" and featured vocals from Chilean singer Deetah. There were two versions: the full length version and the radio mix. The radio mix is much shorter and omits all three verses from Dramacydal. The full length version only omits Big Malcolm's verse, and both versions omit Stretch's first verse. It was produced by StoneBridge and Felix da Soulcat.

In 2003, "Runnin' (Dying to Live)", a remix of this song produced by Eminem, was released as a single from the Tupac: Resurrection soundtrack. This version vastly differs from the original, using the 2Pac verse from the Me Against the World version, utilizing a different melody, discarding the performances by Dramacydal and Stretch, and having a sample of Edgar Winter's "Dying to Live" as the chorus. The remix charted at #19 on the Billboard Hot 100, and is arguably now more well known than the original.

The first lines from the Notorious B.I.G.'s verse ("I grew up a fuckin' screw up / Got introduced to the game / Got an ounce and fuckin' blew up") were later sampled as a hook on Ludacris' 2006 single "Grew Up a Screw Up".

Charts and certifications

Weekly charts

Year-end charts

Certifications

Track listing

1998 Remixes
 "Runnin (Stone's Radio RMX)
 "Runnin (Stone's RMX Full Length)
 "Runnin (Stone's Original Vibe Mix)
 "Runnin (RMX Full TV track)
 "Runnin (RMX Full Instrumental)

References

External links 
[ One Million Strong] at Allmusic
One Million Strong at Discogs

Songs about crime
Songs about police officers
1995 songs
Tupac Shakur songs
The Notorious B.I.G. songs
Song recordings produced by Easy Mo Bee

it:Runnin'